= 2008 Murshidabad murder =

People killed by Islamic terrorism

The 2008 Murshibad murder was the beheading of Shailendra Prasad, a Hindu labourer from Bihar for marrying Munira Bibi a Muslim girl from West Bengal, on the orders of a shalishi court in Murshidabad on 14 July 2008. Munira Bibi, the widow of the victim, eventually regretted her ill-fated visit to her parental home where she lost her husband.

== Background ==
Shailendra Prasad, a native of Bihar, worked as a labourer in Mumbai, where Munira worked as a maid servant. They fell in love and married in 2001. Munira came from an orthodox village, where a shalishi court had fined her father Ansari Sheikh a sum of two hundred rupees for sending his daughter to work in Mumbai.

== Trial and execution ==
The couple visited Lakshmanpur again in July 2008, this time with their ten-month-old son. As on the previous occasion, Shailendra had to assume the identity of Munna Sheikh to escape the wrath of the orthodox villagers. His father-in-law Ansari Sheikh, however, noticed that he did not offer his Friday prayers, nor responded spontaneously to greetings. On 14 July, Ansari Sheikh overheard a muttering from Shailendra during a religious ritual, that was a dead giveaway of his religion and informed the village elders his suspicion in the afternoon. A shalishi court was convened on the grounds of the village primary school that evening by the village elders. At the court, Shailendra was forcibly disrobed to check his religious identity and when he was found uncircumcised he was beaten up severely. Twenty-two political and religious leaders of the shalishi court, along with Ansari Sheikh, pronounced Shailendra guilty of marrying a Muslim girl and awarded him the death sentence. His hands and feet were tied up. He was gagged and taken to a nearby jute field, where his throat was slit by four executioners.

As Shailendra Prasad went missing from the night of 14 July, his wife Munira Bibi believed that he had fled to Mumbai. Her father had kept everything from her mother and brother. On 27 July, when Munira learned of her husband's fate from other villagers she accompanied her mother and brother to the Berhampore police station to lodge a formal complaint. The police had already discovered the beheaded body of an unidentified man inside a gunny bag lying in the jute fields ten days before on 17 July. On 28 July, the police raided the village and arrested three persons who presided over the shalishi. The rest of the villagers who took part in the shalishi and Ansari Sheikh fled the village. On 1 August, a large police force led by the additional Superintendent of Police Debashis Bej raided the village of Lakshmanpur and detained 26 villagers for interrogation.

Home Secretary Ashok Mohan Chakrabarti promised to take the strictest possible action against the culprits.
